The 1967 GP Ouest-France was the 31st edition of the GP Ouest-France cycle race and was held on 29 August 1967. The race started and finished in Plouay. The race was won by François Hamon.

General classification

References

1967
1967 in road cycling
1967 in French sport